A journeyman is a tradesman or craftsman who has completed an apprenticeship, but is not yet a Master tradesman.

Journeyman may also refer to:

TV and games
 Journeyman (TV series), a 2007 American science fiction television drama
 The Journeyman Project a science fiction adventure game series

Film
 Journeyman (film), a 2017 UK film
 Journeyman Pictures (US), a film production company founded by Paul Mezey
 Journeyman Pictures, a film distribution company founded by Mark Stucke

Music
 Journeyman (album), a 1989 album by Eric Clapton
 The Journeymen, a folk music trio of John Phillips, Scott McKenzie and Dick Weissman
 "Journeyman", recording name of Paul Frankland (a.k.a. Woob) and Colin Waterton
 Journey, Man!, a 1996 album by trumpeter Jack Walrath

Songs
 "Journeyman", a song from Jethro Tull's 1978 album Heavy Horses
 "Journeyman", a song from Praying Mantis' 1993 album A Cry for the New World
 "Journeyman", a song from Iron Maiden's 2003 album Dance of Death
 "Journeyman", a song from Amon Tobin's 2011 album ISAM
 "Journeyman", a song from Blackmore's Night's 2012 album A Knight In York
 "Journey Man", a song from Korpiklaani's 2005 album Voice of Wilderness

Other uses
 Journeyman (boxing), a fighter who has adequate boxing skill, but does not have the caliber of a contender or gatekeeper
 Journeyman (sports), an athlete or professional sports player who is technically competent, but unable to excel or one who plays for many different teams over the course of a career
 Journeyman quarterback, in professional American football, is a quarterback who plays short stints for several teams over a career.
 Journeyman, a 1935 novel by Erskine Caldwell